Pronexus is a software company based in Ottawa, Ontario, founded in 1994. The company produces voice application and Interactive Voice Response tools that developers can use to integrate voice/speech technology with business systems. The company is most notable for its development of the VBVoice, a rapid application development (RAD) Interactive Voice Response (IVR) toolkit for telephony and speech inside Microsoft Visual Studio.NET. First introduced in 1994, VBVoice includes a graphical user interface (GUI) for call flow and call control. Many IVR applications can be created with the toolkit, including auto attendants, outbound IVRs, predictive dialers, and self-service IVRs.

History 
2020

 ProNexus LLC joined the Oracle NetSuite Solution Provider Program

2010
Pronexus releases VBVoice 7
Pronexus launches IVR solutions locator
Pronexus achieves Microsoft Gold Certified Partner status
Pronexus partners with distributor Bludis

2009
Pronexus opens Compentency Center in Mumbai, India under joint operating agreement with Techtree IT
Pronexus wins its 14th Product of the Year award for VBVoice
VBVoice 5.6 IVR Development Application voted "Best Development Tool" at World's Communication Conference – ITEXPO EAST 2009 

2007
Pronexus introduces a Japanese version of its Interactive Voice Response (IVR) toolkit VBVoice
2004
Pronexus awarded "Innovation Award of Excellence - Exporting"
2003
Gary T. Hannah named a recipient of the 'Forty under 40' Award
2001
Gary T. Hannah and employees acquire Pronexus ownership, making it a 100% private, Canadian corporation
2000
Active Voice takes 100% interest in Pronexus, making it a wholly owned subsidiary of Active Voice
Gary T. Hannah is named president and CEO of Pronexus
Pronexus announces partnership with Nuance Communications
1997
Active Voice acquires 51% shares in Pronexus
1996
VBVoice awarded 1st Computer Telephony Product of the Year
1994
Pronexus is incorporated and VBVoice is launched, Microsoft an early adopter.
1993
Ian Bowles, founder of Pronexus, starts programming VBVoice

References 

Companies based in Ottawa
Telephony
Software companies of Canada